Crambionella is a genus of cnidarians belonging to the family Catostylidae. It is distinguished from other Catostylidae genera by arms ending in pyramidal and naked terminal clubs without whip-like filaments. The species of this genus are found in the coasts of Indian Ocean, the Arabian Sea, and the Red Sea. The first identification of this genus was C. orsini in the Red Sea in the waters of Chennai and later the Gulf of Oman and the Strait of Hormuz. At least one species, C. helmbiru, is raised commercially for food in the Cilacap region of Java.

Species 
Crambionella annandalei 
Crambionella helmbiru 
Crambionella orsini 
Crambionella stuhlmanni

References

Catostylidae
Scyphozoan genera